Herr Puntila and His Servant Matti (German: Herr Puntila und sein Knecht Matti) is a 1960 Austrian comedy film directed by Alberto Cavalcanti and starring Curt Bois, Heinz Engelmann and Maria Emo. It was made at the Soviet-controlled Rosenhügel Studios in Vienna. Production began in 1955, but wasn't completed until 1960. The film is based on the 1948 play of the same name by Bertolt Brecht.

Cast
 Curt Bois as Johannes Puntila  
 Heinz Engelmann as Matti Altonen  
 Maria Emo as Eva Puntila  
 Erika Pelikowsky as Sandra  
 Yelena Polevitskaya as Sandra Klinckmann  
 Inge Holzleitner as Fina  
 Dorothea Neff as Pröbstin  
 Elfriede Irrall as Lisu  
 Edith Prager as Manda  
 Erland Erlandsen as L'attaché 
 Karl Skraup as Josef, Apotheker  
 Otto Schmöle as Richter  
 Otto Wögerer as Bibelius  
 Max Brod as Advokat  
 Fritz Heller as Minister 
 Gaby Banschenbach as Laina  
 Josef Gmeinder as Arzt  
 Aladar Kunrad as Polizeioberst  
 Fritz Links as Probst  
 Armand Ozory as Dentist  
 Elisabeth Stiepl as Schmuggler-Emma 
 Peter Sturm
 Robert Werner as Journalist  
 Mela Wigandt as Apothekerin

References

Bibliography
 Davidson, John & Hake, Sabine. Framing the Fifties: Cinema in a Divided Germany. Berghahn Books, 2007.

External links 
 

1960 films
1960 comedy films
Austrian comedy-drama films
1960s German-language films
Films directed by Alberto Cavalcanti
Austrian films based on plays
Films based on works by Bertolt Brecht
Films set in Finland
German comedy-drama films
Films shot at Rosenhügel Studios
1960s German films